Jeanne Bourin or Jeanne Mondot (13 January 1922 – 19 March 2003) was a French writer known for her historical novels.

Life
Jeanne Mondot was born in Paris in 1922. She married the writer André Bourin in 1942. Catholic returned to the faith of her childhood at the age of 40, she admires medieval society which she studied extensively and depicts she in the framework of her novels.

In 1963 her book Le bonheur est une femme: roman and this was a historic fiction about the relationship between Pierre de Ronsard (Prince of Poets) and Cassandra Salviati. 

Her sentimental and idealized vision of the Middle Ages, still close to the one of Régine Pernoud, earned her criticism from academics such as the medievalist Robert Fossier. She rediscovers, following Régine Pernoud, the important place given to women at that time, and especially from the eleventh to the thirteenth century. By thus going against many preconceived ideas about the Middle Ages, she honours these centuries which she qualified in her autobiographical story The Smile of the Angel (Le sourire de l'ange) as "courteous, luminous and creative".

She wrote a number of other novels and she was given several awards including the Legion of Honour.

Jeanne Bourin died in Le Mesnil-le-Roi in 2003.

Notable works
  Le bonheur est une femme (1963)
  Très sage Héloïse (1966)
  Agnès Sorel, la dame de Beauté (1970)
 La Chambre des dames (1979), Grand prix des lectrices de Elle
 Le Jeu de la tentation (1981)
 Cuisine médiévale pour tables d'aujourd'hui (1983)
 Le Grand feu (1985)
 Les Amours blessées (1987)
 Les Pérégrines (1989)
 La Rose et la Mandragore (1990)
 Compagnons d’éternité (1992)
 La Garenne (1994)
 Le Sourire de l'Ange (1996)

References

1922 births
2003 deaths
Writers from Paris
French Roman Catholic writers
20th-century French non-fiction writers
20th-century French women writers
Prix Maison de la Presse winners